Nanstein Castle is a ruined medieval castle above the town of Landstuhl in Germany, which has been partially reconstructed. The red sandstone rock castle dates from the 12th century and was once owned by Franz von Sickingen, who was mortally wounded during a siege of the castle in 1523.

History  

Frederick I of Germany had Nanstein Castle built about 1152.

Imperial Knight and Protestant reformer Franz von Sickingen modernized the castle in the 16th century and turned it into a citadel that was supposed to withstand the artillery of the age. In 1523 (during the so-called "Knights' Revolt"), the castle was besieged by the Archbishop of Trier, Palatine Elector Louis V, and Landgrave of Hesse. Sickingen fell mortally wounded during the siege.

Sickingen's sons received the partially destroyed castle back from Elector Louis V in 1542 (as a feudal tenure), and immediately rebuilt it in a Renaissance style. In 1668, the Elector Charles Louis captured the restored castle and had it partially destroyed. French troops destroyed other parts in 1689. In the following centuries several repairs were made, but it remains a castle ruin.

References

Further reading

External links 

 
 
 Nanstein Castle at Legendary Castles of the Palatinate

1150s establishments in the Holy Roman Empire
12th-century fortifications
Buildings and structures completed in the 1150s
Buildings and structures in Landstuhl
Castles in Rhineland-Palatinate
Frederick I, Holy Roman Emperor
Gothic architecture in Germany
Hill castles
Holy Roman Empire
House of Sickingen
Imperial castles
Nine Years' War
Renaissance architecture in Germany
Renaissance buildings and structures
Ruined castles in Germany
Sandstone buildings in Germany
Tourist attractions in Landstuhl